Boris Becker was the defending champion, but did not compete this year.

Michael Stich won the title by defeating Stefan Edberg 6–4, 6–7(5–7), 6–3, 6–2 in the final.

Seeds

Draw

Finals

Top half

Bottom half

References

External links
 Official results archive (ATP)
 Official results archive (ITF)

1993 ATP Tour